Edite Cristiana Fernandes (born 10 October 1979) is a Portuguese former footballer who most recently played for CF Benfica of the Campeonato Nacional de Futebol Feminino. She is a former captain of the Portugal women's national football team, who scored a national record 39 goals in the 132 caps she accumulated between 1997 and 2016.

Club career

Edite began her career with local club Boavista, before moving to Lisbon side 1º Dezembro at age 19. She would win nine Portuguese Liga titles and three Portugal Cups at the two clubs before moving abroad to play in China and Spain.

In August 2002 Edite was the Player of the Match as Beijing Chengjian beat Shanghai SVA on penalties in the Chinese Women's Super League final.

She has played for several clubs in Spain, and joined Arsenal Ladies F.C. for pre-season training but did not sign a permanent deal with the club. She also played in Norway's Toppserien with Donn during 2010.

Veteran Edite transferred from SC Braga to CF Benfica in July 2018. In April 2021, 41-year-old Edite announced her departure from CF Benfica and her retirement as a footballer.

International career

Edite made her Portugal national team debut in a friendly match against Belgium at Cantanhede in 1997. In November 2011 she made her 100th appearance for the national team, having scored 31 goals. In March 2016 she moved level with Luís Figo's total of 129 caps.

International goals

References

External links

Edite Fernandes Official

1979 births
Living people
Portuguese women's footballers
Portugal women's international footballers
Expatriate women's footballers in China
Expatriate women's footballers in Spain
Portuguese expatriate sportspeople in China
Portuguese expatriate sportspeople in Spain
USL W-League (1995–2015) players
FIFA Century Club
Primera División (women) players
Atlético Madrid Femenino players
Zaragoza CFF players
FK Donn players
Toppserien players
Expatriate women's footballers in Norway
People from Vila do Conde
Portuguese expatriate footballers
Portuguese expatriate sportspeople in Norway
Women's association football forwards
Campeonato Nacional de Futebol Feminino players
Valadares Gaia F.C. (women) players
S.C. Braga (women's football) players
S.U. 1º Dezembro (women) players
Beijing BG Phoenix F.C. players
Sportspeople from Porto District
Boavista F.C. (women) players